Thomas R. Richards (born 1947) is a retired United States Navy rear admiral who commanded the Naval Special Warfare Command from 1996 to 1999.

Naval career
Thomas Richards graduated from Villanova University in 1969 and was commissioned through the Navy Reserve Officers Training Corps. After his commission as an Ensign in the U.S. Navy, Richards received orders to Basic Underwater Demolition/SEAL training (BUD/S) at Naval Amphibious Base Coronado. After six months of training, Richards graduated BUD/S class 55 in April 1970 and received assignment to SEAL TEAM ONE. Following SEAL Basic Indoctrination (SBI) training and platoon training, Richards deployed to South Vietnam with Zulu Platoon from August 1970 to February 1971. He was wounded in February 1971 at the end of his tour and was awarded the Bronze Star Medal and Purple Heart.
Richards led naval special operations forces during Operation Prime Chance and Operation Praying Mantis in the Persian Gulf.
Richards served in numerous staff and command positions including operations officer NSWG 1; operations officer, SEAL TEAM TWO, executive officer, Underwater Demolition Team Twelve (UDT-12), commanding officer, Special Boat Unit Thirteen; senior U.S. Naval representative at the U.S. Military Group (MILGRU) in El Salvador from 1983 to 1984; commanding officer, SEAL Team ONE from 1986 to 1988; programs officer with the Naval Sea Systems Command in Washington, D.C., and commanding officer, Naval Special Warfare Center.
From 1996 to 1999, Richards served as the commanding officer of the Naval Special Warfare Command. He retired from active duty in 1999 after 30 years of service.

This article contains material from the United States Federal Government and is in the public domain.

Awards and decorations

References

1947 births
United States Navy admirals
Recipients of the Legion of Merit
Recipients of the Defense Superior Service Medal
United States Naval Special Warfare Command
United States Navy SEALs personnel
Recipients of the Meritorious Service Medal (United States)
Living people